Loch Beannach is a small v-shaped loch, located 2 miles to the west of Loch Assynt and 3 miles northeast of Lochinver within the Assynt area of Sutherland, Scotland.  The loch is located in an area known as the Assynt-Coigach National Scenic Area, one of 40 such areas in Scotland.

Conservation
The northeastern part of the loch is a designated Site of Special Scientific Interest (SSSI).  The specific area covered are the Downy Birch woodland on eight islands within the loch. The woodland is a prime example of the type that would have covered the area extensively in the past. The area of the site SSSI overlaps with the areas general Assynt Lochs SSSI,  that is notable for its population of black-throated divers where the loch is one of the nesting sites for this species. The Loch is also a nesting site for Common Gull, European golden plover Meadow Pipit. Red Grouse, Skylark, Swallow, Wheatear. The lilly Nuphar pumila grows around the loch.

Township
To the east of the loch is a former crofting township that was cleared during the 19th Century. Its name was never discovered. It consists of 11 former crofts, consisting of sizes of 3.0m by 2.0m to 16.0m by 5.0m in two groups. The evidence for lazy bed cultivation is still visible. On the stream that issues from Loch an t- Sabhail are the remains of a corn-mill and a dam further upstream.

Geography
Loch Beannach flows along a unnamed stream into Loch Bad nan  Aighean directly south. The ground around the loch is hummocky with stretches of peat bog and water lying between bare rocky knolls.

Directly to  the north-west, the loch is overlooked by the triple peak's of Quinag.

References

External links
 Angling in Assynt A Guide for Visitors

Beannach
Inver catchment
Birdwatching sites in Scotland
Sites of Special Scientific Interest in Scotland
Special Areas of Conservation in Scotland
Beannach